North Estonia Medical Centre (abbreviated NEMC, abbreviated PERH) is an Estonian medical centre which main building is located in Mustamäe, Tallinn.

North Estonia Medical Centre Foundation was established on 25 July 2001.

The centre consists of 7 clinics and 32 specialist centres. In total, over 4800 people are working there.

In a year, about 144,000 patients are given specialised medical care. In a year, about 84,000 patients are helped via emergency medicine.

References

External links

Hospitals in Estonia